George Earle may refer to:

George Howard Earle Jr. (1856–1928), American lawyer
George Howard Earle III (1890–1974), American politician, diplomat and governor of Pennsylvania
George Earle (rugby union) (born 1987), South African rugby union footballer
George Hussey Earle Sr. (1823–1907), Philadelphia lawyer and abolitionist

See also
George Earle Chamberlain (1854–1928), American politician, legislator, and public official in Oregon
George Earle Buckle (1854–1935), English editor and biographer
George Earl (disambiguation)